"The Displaced Person" is a novella by Flannery O'Connor. It was published in 1955 in her short story collection A Good Man Is Hard to Find. A devout Roman Catholic, O'Connor often used religious themes in her work and her own family hired a displaced person after World War II.

Plot summary 
The story takes place on a farm in Georgia, just after World War II in the 1940s. The owner of the farm, Mrs. McIntyre, contacts a Catholic priest to find her a "displaced person" to work as a farm hand. The priest finds a Polish refugee named Mr. Guizac who relocates with his family to the farm. Because the displaced person is quite industrious, the Shortleys, a family of white farm hands, feel threatened and try to manipulate Mrs. McIntyre into firing Guizac, but Mrs. McIntyre decides to fire Shortley instead because of his unsatisfactory work. When she finds out that Guizac has asked his teenage cousin to come to America by marrying one of the African American farm hands, she is appalled, her appreciation of him melts down. A few weeks later Mr. Shortley comes back and says Mrs. Shortley died of a stroke on the day that they left. Mrs. McIntyre rehires Mr. Shortley, but realizes it was Mrs. Shortley she has been missing. Under the pressure of public opinion and because of her own resentment, Mrs. McIntyre is intending to fire Mr. Guizac, but puts it off several times. When she eventually goes to fire him, she becomes a silent participant in his murder, when – with Mrs. McIntyre quietly observing – a bitter, resentful Mr. Shortley positions a tractor to roll over Guizac's body as if by accident as he works beneath another machine. The tractor finally does so, crushing and killing him. Mrs. McIntyre's farmhands abandon her and, after she suffers a nervous collapse, she is bedridden and receives no visitors save for the priest.

Analysis
The story was written while O'Connor was residing with her mother at a farm called Andalusia. Scholars believe that the farm was the inspiration for the setting in "The Displaced Person" and is the work most closely associated with Andalusia. O'Connor's mother also employed a Polish refugee family and several African American laborers at Andalusia.

Flannery O'Connor was fascinated with peacocks, described in her essay "The King of the Birds." In the story, the way the characters view the peacocks often corresponds to their own moral compass. For example, Father Flynn and Astor have positive attitudes towards the birds and are generally likable characters, while Mrs. McIntyre starves the birds and reduces their population, making her a villain.

Adaptation
The story was adapted and released in 1977 as a Public Television production for the series The American Short Story, starring Irene Worth and Shirley Stoler. The cast also includes John Houseman, Robert Earl Jones, and Samuel L. Jackson. It was filmed at Andalusia.

See also
Anti-miscegenation laws in the United States

References

External links
 

Short stories by Flannery O'Connor
1955 short stories
Southern Gothic short stories